Mignon is a feminine given name and a surname. It may refer to:

Given name
 Mignon Anderson (1892–1983), American actress
 Mignon Holland Anderson (born 1945), American writer
 Mignon Clyburn (born 1962), a commissioner at the Federal Communications Commission
 Mignon du Preez (born 1989), South African cricketer
 Mignon Dunn (born 1928), American mezzo-soprano and voice teacher
 Mignon G. Eberhart (1899–1996), American mystery novelist
 Mignon Fogarty (born 1967), American professor of journalism and former science writer
 Mignon McLaughlin (1913–1983), American journalist and author
 Mignon Nevada (1886–1971), English operatic soprano
 Mignon O'Doherty (1890–1961), Australian actress who worked in British theatre, film and television
 Mignon Talbot (1869–1950), American paleontologist

Surname
 Abraham Mignon (1640–1679), Dutch painter
 Clément Mignon (born 1993), French swimmer
 Edward Mignon (1885–1925), English first-class cricketer
 Emmanuelle Mignon (born 1968), French politician
 Jean-Claude Mignon (born 1950), French politician
 Herman Mignon (born 1951), Belgian middle-distance runner
 Léon Mignon (1847–1898), Belgian sculptor
 William Mignon (1874–1965), West Indian cricketer

Feminine given names